Jeff Grace is a comedian, screenwriter, film producer, film director, and actor. Grace serves as the director of Folk Hero & Funny Guy, an independent film starring Wyatt Russell, Alex Karpovsky, Hannah Simone, Heather Morris, Meredith Hagner, and Melanie Lynskey. Grace wrote the screenplay for the film about estranged friends on a journey. He also serves as a director and writer with 99 Tigers, a creative services agency.

Early life and education
Grace grew up in the Basking Ridge section of Bernards Township, New Jersey.

He graduated from Morristown-Beard School in Morristown, New Jersey. During his studies at the school, he played hockey and served as senior class president. He also participated in Model United Nations. Grace earned a bachelor's degree in political economics from Colorado College in Colorado Springs, Colorado.

Film and TV career

In 2008, Grace co-founded Vacationeer Productions, an independent production company. Vacationeer Productions released The Scenesters, an art-house, black comedy film directed by Todd Berger, in 2009. Co-produced by Grace, Kevin M. Brennan, and Brett D. Thompson, The Scenesters won awards at the Hollywood Film Festival and Slamdance Film Festival. In 2012, Vacationeer Productions released It's a Disaster, another black comedy film. Brennan, Grace, Gordon Buelonic, and Datari Turner produced it.

Grace began production on Folk Hero & Funny Guy during the fall of 2013. Crowd funding through the website Kickstarter.com helped the film to raise more than $50,000.

Grace has starred in the film Super Zeroes and appeared on several TV shows. He has guest starred on Mad Men, How I Met Your Mother, and Castle. Grace has also written for The Henry Rollins Show.

Filmography

References

External links
 

American male comedians
21st-century American comedians
American male actors
Film producers from New Jersey
Colorado College alumni
People from Bernards Township, New Jersey
Living people
Morristown-Beard School alumni
Film directors from New Jersey
Year of birth missing (living people)